Nikolai Podgorny (1903–1983) was a Soviet politician.

Podgorny or Podgornoye may also refer to:

People
 Irina Podgorny (born 1963), Argentine anthropologist and historian of science
 Nikita Podgorny (1931–1982), Soviet actor
 Nikolai Podgorny (actor) (1879–1947), Russian and Soviet actor
 Yevgeni Podgorny (born 1977), Russian gymnast

Places

Russia
 Podgorny (rural locality), in Maykop
 Podgorny, Russia, a list of inhabited localities in Russia
 Podgorny, Amur Oblast, a selo in Svobodnensky District
 Podgorny, Maykopsky District, Republic of Adygea
 Podgornoye, Tomsk Oblast, a selo in Chainsky District
 Podgorny, Zheleznogorsk, Krasnoyarsk Krai, an administrative division of Krasnoyarsk Krai

Other places
 Podgornoye, Kazakhstan, a village in the Almaty Region, Kazakhstan
 Podgornoye, Chüy, a village in the Chüy Region, Kyrgyzstan
 Kamion Podgórny, a village in Gmina Młodzieszyn, Masovian Voivodeship, Poland